Shivaree may refer to:
 Shivaree (custom), a clamorous salutation made to, or noisy protest against, a newlywed couple
 Shivaree (band), an American band formed in 1997 
 Shivaree (play), a play by William Mastrosimone
 Shivaree (TV series), an American popular music television program originating from Hollywood that aired from 1965 to 1966 and was hosted by Gene Weed
 "The Shivaree", episode 20 from season 3 of The Waltons
 "Shivaree", episode 19 from season 1 of The Rifleman